Level Headed is the sixth studio album by British glam rock band Sweet. Different versions were released by Polydor in Europe and by Capitol in the US, Canada and Japan. The album features "Love Is Like Oxygen", the band's last single to hit the top 40, peaking at #8 in the US and #9 in the UK. The single version of "Love Is Like Oxygen" is substantially shorter than the album version. A second single, "California Nights", was released from the album but only reached #76 in the US.

This was the last album to feature the classic Sweet lineup, as Brian Connolly departed around a year after the album's release, in order to embark on a solo career. The remaining trio of Steve Priest, Andy Scott, and Mick Tucker continued, and delivered three more albums before breaking up in 1981.

Reception

AllMusic lauded the album in their retrospective review, praising the wild sampling of styles and the band's shift from their earlier bubblegum singles to album-driven rock. They concluded "Certainly, this is not classic-era Sweet, but that's precisely what's good about Level Headed - they're off-kilter and adventurous, occasionally stumbling but always making interesting music on an album that's anything but what the title promises."

Track listing
All songs written and composed by Brian Connolly, Steve Priest, Andy Scott, and Mick Tucker except where noted.

Polydor release
Side one
"Dream On" (Scott) – 2:53
"Love Is Like Oxygen" (Scott, Trevor Griffin) – 6:53
"California Nights" – 3:45
"Strong Love" – 3:28
"Fountain" – 4:44
Side two
"Anthem No. I (Lady of the Lake)" – 4:11
"Silverbird" – 3:26
"Lettres D'Amour" – 3:30
"Anthem No. II" – 1:02
"Air on 'A' Tape Loop" (Priest, Scott, Tucker) – 5:59

Bonus tracks on 1991/1997 reissues
"Love Is Like Oxygen" (single version) - 3:48
"Cover Girl" – 3:34
"California Nights" (single version)  – 3:22
"Show Me The Way" – 3:22

Bonus track on 2005 reissue
"Love Is Like Oxygen" (single version) - 3:49

Capitol release
This version has different artwork and a different running order
Side one
"California Nights" - 3:39
"Silverbird" - 3:24
"Dream On" - 2:50
"Fountain" (last part with harpsichord is shorter and no hi-hat cymbals) - 4:12
"Love Is Like Oxygen" - 6:49
Side two
"Anthem No. I (Lady of the Lake)" - 4:08
"Strong Love" - 3:28
"Lettres D'Amour" - 3:27
"Anthem No. II" - 0:58
"Air on 'A' Tape Loop" - 5:59

Personnel
Sweet
Brian Connolly – lead vocals (except as noted)
Steve Priest – bass guitar, synthesizer voice, lead vocals (track 3), backing vocals
Andy Scott – guitar, synthesizer, lead vocals (track 1, 5), backing vocals
Mick Tucker – drums, percussion, backing vocals

Additional personnel
Ronnie Asprey – brass
Richard Harvey – baroque wind
Stevie Lange – vocals (track 8)
Geoff Westley – keyboards, string arrangements (tracks 6, 9)
Louis Austin – engineer

References

The Sweet albums
1978 albums
Polydor Records albums
Capitol Records albums
Art rock albums by English artists
Neo-progressive rock albums
Progressive rock albums by English artists